A Tale of Five Balloons (Hebrew: מעשה בחמישה בלונים, Ma'ase b'Khamisha Balonim) is an Israeli children's book by Miriam Roth published in 1974 and illustrated by Ora Ayal. The book has become a classic of Israeli children's literature.

Plot
The book is about five children each of whom get a balloon from Ruti's mother — a blue balloon for Ruti, yellow for Ron, purple for Sigalit, green for Uri and red for Alon. During the book, all the children's balloons burst, with the exception of Alon's, which the wind blew out of the children's reach. The children look at the balloon and shout "Bye, bye, red balloon!".

Whenever one of the balloons bursts, the children are comforted and told "that's how all balloons end up". Each balloon had burst for the following different reasons:

 Uri's balloon burst due to contact with a rose bush while Uri was playing with it like a ball.
 Ron's balloon burst after his father over-inflated it since Ron wanted it to be "as big as the Sun".
 Sigalit's balloon burst after being scratched by Mitzi, Sigalit's cat.
 Ruti's balloon burst after she hugged it tightly.

Educational value
The text can help pre-schoolers deal with loss, including more permanent losses later in life, such as losing a pet or friend.  Roth revealed that the story-line evolved from efforts to comfort her own children when a balloon she brought home after being away for a while burst. The book also explores number and color concepts in rhyming, musical language.

See also
Hebrew literature

References

1974 children's books
Israeli books
Picture books